William Milton Lamb (14 July 1909 – 21 June 2006) was an Australian rules footballer who played with Geelong in the Victorian Football League (VFL).

Overview 
Lamb, recruited locally from Geelong College, was a back pocket defender. He played all 21 games for Geelong in 1930, including their grand final loss. The following season he missed just one game all year and again featured in the grand final, this time finishing in the winning team. He had been one of Geelong's best players in the 1931 Grand Final, with 13 kicks and a good defensive job of the Richmond rovers.

Death 
He lived until the age of 96 (died 21 June 2006) and was the last surviving player from the 1931 Geelong premiership winning side.

References

1909 births
2006 deaths
Australian rules footballers from Victoria (Australia)
Geelong Football Club players
Geelong Football Club Premiership players
People educated at Geelong College
One-time VFL/AFL Premiership players